Blue lily may refer to the following plant species:
Agapanthus praecox, native to South Africa and widely cultivated
Nymphaea caerulea (Blue Egyptian water lily or sacred blue lily), native to East Africa and widely cultivated
Nymphaea violacea, a species of waterlily native to northern Australia
Stypandra glauca (nodding blue lily), native to Australia
Thelionema caespitosum (tufted blue lily), native to Australia
Triteleia grandiflora, native to western North America

See also
 Blue bead lily, Clintonia borealis
Dianella (plant), a genus of plants known as flax lilies, with blue flowers and blue berry-like fruit